The untitled sixth studio album by the Canadian rock band Trooper (informally known as Trooper 1980) was released  on October 4, 1980.  It remains the only Trooper album not to chart a hit single on Canada's RPM 100 Singles chart.

Track listing
(McGuire/Smith)

 4:32 - "Don't Feel Like Dancing"
 3:32 - "If I Never See Your Face Again"
 4:44 - "Are You Still My Baby"
 3:37 - "Real Canadians"
 3:43 - "Legend"
 3:47 - "Dump That Creep"
 3:34 - "Laura"
 3:57 - "I Don't Wanna Be Here"
 5:04 - "Volunteer Victims"

Band members

 Vocals - Ra McGuire
 Guitar - Brian Smith
 Drums - Tommy Stewart
 Bass - Doni Underhill
 Keyboards - Rob Deans

Singles

 "Real Canadians" / "Go Ahead And Sue Me"
 "Laura" / "I Don't Wanna Be Here"
 "Are You Still My Baby" / "Legend"

Trooper (band) albums
1980 albums